Eremophila weldii is a flowering plant in the figwort family, Scrophulariaceae and is endemic to Australia. It is a shrub with glabrous green leaves, small sepals and purple or lilac-coloured petals and it occurs in arid and semi-arid areas of Western Australia and South Australia.

Description
Its branches are glabrous, yellowish-green to green in colour but often with a purplish tinge near the ends but light brown in the older, woody parts. The leaves are arranged alternately, sometimes scattered, others clustered near the ends of the branches.

The petal tube is lilac-coloured to purple, often whitish on the lower surface. The petal tube and lobes are mostly glabrous except that the lower petal lobe and the inside of the tube are covered with woolly hairs. The 4 stamens are enclosed in the petal tube although 2 may be the same length as it.

Taxonomy and naming
The species was first formally described in 1870 by Victorian Government Botanist Ferdinand von Mueller in the seventh volume of his Fragmenta Phytographiae Australiae. Mueller's description was based on specimens collected from Eucla and Point Dover by John Forrest. The specific epithet weldii honours Frederick Aloysius Weld, then Governor of Western Australia.

Distribution and habitat
This eremophila occurs in the Nullarbor, Eyre Peninsula and Kangaroo Island botanical regions of South Australia where it is widespread on calcareous soils and red-brown earths. In Western Australia it grows on the Nullarbor Plain east of Balladonia in the Coolgardie, Hampton, Mallee, Murchison and Nullarbor biogeographic regions.

Conservation
Eremophila weldii  is classified as "not threatened" by the Western Australian Government Department of Parks and Wildlife.

Use in horticulture
This is one of the hardiest eremophilas and is well suited to a low maintenance garden. It is easy to strike from cuttings which can be taken at any time of the year. The shrub grows in a wide range of soils, including heavy clay, rarely requires watering, even during a long dry spell and is very frost tolerant.

References

weldii
Eudicots of Western Australia
Flora of South Australia
Plants described in 1870
Endemic flora of Western Australia
Taxa named by Ferdinand von Mueller